2,4,6-Tribromoanisole (TBA) is a chemical compound that is a brominated derivative of anisole. It is one of the chemicals responsible for cork taint.

Tribromoanisole is a fungal metabolite of 2,4,6-tribromophenol, which is used as a fungicide. It can be found in minute traces on packaging materials stored in the presence of fiberboard treated with 2,4,6-tribromophenol. These traces can cause an unpleasant mustiness in packaged foods. 

Tribromoanisole is usually produced when naturally occurring airborne fungi or bacteria (usually Aspergillus sp., Penicillium sp., Actinomycetes, Botrytis cinerea, Rhizobium sp., or Streptomyces) are presented with brominated phenolic compounds, which they then convert into bromoanisole derivatives. The bromophenols can originate from various contaminants including those found in some pesticides and wood preservatives. They can also migrate from other objects such as shipping pallets treated by bromophenols.

Tribromoanisole has a very low odor detection threshold. It is 0.08-0.3 parts per trillion (ppt) in water and 2-6 ppt in wine (or 3.4-7.9 ng/L) so even very minute amounts can be detected. It causes unpleasant earthy, musty and moldy aromas.

Consumer product recalls
There have been several events in which consumer products were recalled due to odors caused by tribromoanisole on product packaging. In 2010 and 2011, Johnson & Johnson voluntarily recalled some over-the-counter products, including Tylenol, due to an odor caused by tribromoanisole. In this case, a supplier had used 2,4,6-tribromophenol to treat wooden pallets on which product packaging materials were transported and stored. In 2010 and in 2011, Pfizer recalled bottles of Lipitor after reports of an odor linked to the packaging bottles. Pfizer said the bottles were supplied by a third-party manufacturer and determined the cause to be exposure of the bottles to low levels of tribromoanisole as they were shipped or stored.

See also
 2,4,6-Trichloroanisole

References

Bromoarenes
Phenol ethers